The Chulu Ranch is a tourist attraction ranch in Beinan Township, Taitung County, Taiwan.

History
The ranch was opened in 1973.

Geology
The ranch land is located 200-390 meters above sea level with an area of 70 hectares in a slopped land.

Business
Annual milk production by the cows in the ranch is 500 tons. The ranch also sells dairy and skin care products. Various activities can be done at the ranch, such as horse riding.

Transportation
The ranch is accessible north west from Shanli Station of the Taiwan Railways Administration.

See also
 List of tourist attractions in Taiwan

References

External links

  

1973 establishments in Taiwan
Cultural infrastructure completed in 1973
Ranches in Taiwan
Tourist attractions in Taitung County